Genny  is an Italian ready-to-wear manufacturer. It was founded in Ancona in 1961 by Arnaldo Girombelli.

History 
Born in Ancona, Arnaldo Girombelli was the owner of a boutique with an adjacent small tailor workshop for skirts and blouses in his hometown. After gradually expanding the workshop and increasing the number of seamstresses, in 1962 he founded a label for his creations, "Genny", named after his eldest daughter.

In the second half of the 1960s Genny started to have a large success thanks to a line of pleated oblique skirts obtained through a new treatment technique of cloth,  then in 1973 it introduced a youthful line, "Byblos", and Gianni Versace became its designer.  Later, Guy Paulin and his assistant Christian Lacroix replaced Versace at Byblos, while Versace launched another Genny's experimental line, "Complice". In 1983, Byblos became an independent company. After the death of Girombelli, his wife Donatella became the chairwoman of the group.

In 2001 Prada acquired the label, and Genny stopped its production in 2004. In 2011 the label was acquired by Swinger International S.p.A., which decided to relaunch the brand and appointed Gabriele Colangelo as the new designer.

On July 21, 2018, the brand received Tao Award for fashion during the Taomoda event in Taormina.

See also 

 Italian fashion
 Made in Italy

References

External links 

Clothing companies established in 1961
Italian companies established in 1961
Italian suit makers
Luxury brands
High fashion brands
Eyewear brands of Italy
Shoe companies of Italy
Fashion accessory brands
Perfume houses
Bags (fashion)
Swimwear manufacturers
1961 establishments in Italy
Manufacturing companies based in Milan
Clothing brands of Italy